"Haven't Found You Yet" is a song by English boy band Blue. It was written by band members Lee Ryan and Antony Costa along with Alexander Karlsson, Ronny Svendsen, and Anne Judith Wik, and recorded for their sixth studio album, Heart & Soul (2022). Production was helmed by Svendsen and Hugh Goldsmith, with Ben Cartwright credited as vocal producer. "Haven't Found You Yet" was released as the album's lead single on 25 May 2022. It peaked at number 61 on the UK Singles Downloads Chart.

Background
"Haven't Found You Yet" was written by band members Lee Ryan, and Antony Costa along with Alexander Karlsson, Ronny Svendsen, and Anne Judith Wik, while production was overseen by Svendsen and Hugh Goldsmith. It was one of the first songs written for Heart & Soul and cited as a "benchmark" regarding the quality of songs they would produce later. When asked about their decision to release the song as the lead single from the album, they said: "For us it was the album's strongest contender, a mix of the classic blues with a great modern twist."

Music video
A music video for "Haven't Found You Yet" was directed by Jackson Ducasse and released online on 25 May 2022.

Track listing

Notes
  signifies a vocal producer

Charts

Release history

References

Single chart usages for Billboardhot100
Single chart called without song
Single chart making named ref
Single chart usages for Billboardadultcontemporary
Single chart usages for Billboardadultpopsongs
Single chart usages for Billboardpopsongs
Single chart usages for UKdownload
2022 singles
2022 songs
Blue (English band) songs